Gold in China may refer to:
Gold farming in China
Gold mining in China